Guiliano Marthino Lio, or known as Marthino Lio, is Indonesian actor. Lio was born on January 26, 1989, at Surabaya and started his career in the entertainment industry as a model in 2004. He was offered parts on various soap operas and movies. He appeared on several films such as The Guys, as Rene (2017); Eiffel... I'm in Love 2, as Adam (2018); Sultan Agung: Tahta, perjuangan, Cinta, as Raden Mas Rangsang / Sultan Agung Muda (2018) and Sekar (2018, short movie) as Donny. Lio also took part in HBO Asia's miniseries titled Grisse which aired on November 4, 2018.

Aside from acting, Lio also shows his interest in singing. He contributed to the movie soundtrack of Ada Apa Dengan Cinta? 2, produced by Melly Goeslaw and Anto Hoed. He made it through the audition to become Melly Goeslaw's duet partner on a track titled Ratusan Purnama by music label Aquarius Musikindo to promote the song in Malaysia. This song won as Best Soundtrack on Festival Film Indonesia (FFI) 2016 and Best Theme Song on 2016 Maya Awards.

Lio was nominated as best supporting actor on Festival Film Indonesia 2018 and Festival Film Bandung 2018 for his role in Sultan Agung : Tahta, Perjuangan, Cinta.

Career

Film 
 Sayang You Can Dance (2009)
 Merry Go Round (2013)
 Pertemuan
 Sleep Tight Maria
 Special Force
 3 Plihan Hidup (2016)
 The Guys (2017)
 Eiffel... I'm in Love 2] (2018)
 Sultan Agung: Tahta, Perjuangan, Cinta]] (2018)
 Sekar (2018, short movie)
 Nawangish (2019)
 Mantan Manten (2019)
 Move On Aja (2019)
 Matt & Mou (2019)
 Sin (2019)
 Tersanjung (2020)

TV Films and Shows 
 Kawin Gantung 2
 Malin Kundang 2
 Pengen Jadi Bintang
 Cinderella Boy
 Bawang Putih Bawang Merah
 Benci Atau Cinta
 Man In Boy
 Misteri Angka 17
 Cinta Pertama Pacar ke Tiga
 Bukan Sms Biasa
 Tenggelamnya Kapal Pak Burik
 Grisse (2018)

Music 
 Featuring Album ke 6 ELEMENT
 Vokalist Band Pinocchio
 Featuring w/ Melly Goeslaw. Album OST. AADC2 (Ratusan Purnama)

Awards

Pageants

References

External links 
 

1989 births
Living people
People from Surabaya
21st-century Indonesian male singers
Indonesian people of Chinese descent
Indonesian male film actors